Chaima Gobji (born ) is a Tunisian female volleyball player. She is a member of the Tunisia women's national volleyball team and played for CO Kélibia in 2014.

She was part of the Tunisian national team at the 2014 FIVB Volleyball Women's World Championship in Italy.

Clubs
  CO Kélibia (2014)

References

1994 births
Living people
Tunisian women's volleyball players
Place of birth missing (living people)